USS America may refer to: 

 , a 74-gun ship of the line, laid down in 1777, but not launched until 1782 and thereupon given to France
 USS America (IX-41), a 19th-century racing yacht converted for United States naval service during the American Civil War
 , originally the German ocean liner SS Amerika, seized by the United States during World War I and used as a troop transport
 , a  commissioned in 1965 and decommissioned in 1996. Currently the only supercarrier to be expended as a target.
 , an  awarded for construction in June 2007 and commissioned in 2014

See also
 , part of the Civil War "Stone Fleet" deliberately sunk to block the harbor in Charleston, South Carolina; sometimes erroneously referred to as USS America
 , an ocean liner launched in 1939
 , various merchantmen
 America was the name of the Command Module on Apollo 17
 , two ships of the French Navy
 , various ships of the Royal Navy
 
 RMS America
 
 

United States Navy ship names